Haynesville Airport  was a public use airport located in Claiborne Parish, Louisiana, United States. The airport was owned by City of Haynesville and located two nautical miles (3.7 km) north of its central business district.  The land for the airport was donated by Erastus and Fanny Crump of Claiborne Parish.

Facilities 
It had one runway designated 17/35 with an asphalt surface measuring 3,000 by 75 feet (914 x 23 m).

References

External links 
 Aerial photo as of 17 January 1998 from USGS The National Map
 

Defunct airports in Louisiana
Buildings and structures in Claiborne Parish, Louisiana
Transportation in Claiborne Parish, Louisiana